Amason may refer to:

 Alvin Eli Amason (born 1948), Sugpiaq Alaskan painter and sculptor
 Amason Kingi, Kenyan politician
 Amason (band), a Swedish music band

See also
 Amazon (disambiguation)